1,2-Dihydro-1,2-azaborine is an aromatic chemical compound with properties intermediate between benzene and borazine.  Its chemical formula is CBNH.  It resembles a benzene ring, except that two adjacent carbons are replaced by nitrogen and boron, respectively.

Preparation 

After decades of failed attempts, the compound was synthesized in 2008 and reported in January 2009.

One of the synthetic steps is a ring-closing metathesis (RCM) reaction:

References

Aromatic compounds
Boron heterocycles
Nitrogen heterocycles
Six-membered rings
Boron–nitrogen compounds